Emma Ingold (born 12 August 2002) is a Swiss ice hockey player and member of the Swiss national ice hockey team, currently playing in the Women's League (SWHL A) with the Neuchâtel Hockey Academy.

Ingold represented Switzerland at the 2021 IIHF Women's World Championship. As a junior player with the Swiss national under-18 team, she participated in the IIHF Women's U18 World Championships in 2018, 2019, and 2020.

References

External links 
 

Living people
2002 births
Swiss women's ice hockey forwards
21st-century Swiss women